New Bloomfield may refer to:
 New Bloomfield, Missouri, a town in Callaway County
New Bloomfield, Pennsylvania, a borough in Perrry County